In Christianity, the Sign of the Dove was a prearranged sign by which John the Baptist would recognize the Messiah.

The Four Gospels each record an account of the sign of the dove.

And Jesus, when he was baptized, went up straightway out of the water: and, lo, the heavens were opened unto him, and he saw the Spirit of God descending like a dove, and lighting upon him.

In Hebrew, Jonah (יוֹנָה) means dove.

Symbolism of the dove 

The Christian symbol of a dove with an olive branch in its beak pass at the end of forty days, that Noah opened the window of the ark which he had made:...Also he sent forth a dove from him, to see if the waters were abated from off the face of the ground; But the dove found no rest for the sole of her foot, and she returned unto the ark. And he stayed yet other seven days; and again he sent forth the dove out of the ark; And the dove came in to him in the evening; and, lo, in her mouth was an olive leaf pluckt off: so Noah knew that the waters were abated from off the earth. And he stayed yet other seven days; and sent forth the dove; which returned not again unto him any more."Doves were also used in ancient Israel as Korban, or religious sacrifice within the tabernacle and temples."And if the burnt sacrifice for his offering to the Lord be of fowls, then he shall bring his offering of turtledoves, or of young pigeons."In the Ancient Near East and Mediterranean, doves were used as symbols for the Canaanite mother goddess Asherah, the Phoenician goddess Tanit, and the Roman goddesses Venus and Fortune.

Additional biblical uses
: And I said, Oh that I had wings like a dove!  for then would I fly away, and be at rest.
: yet shall ye be as the wings of a dove covered with silver, and her feathers with yellow gold.
: O my dove, that art in the clefts of the rock
: Open to me, my sister, my love, my dove, my undefiled: for my head is filled with dew, and my locks with the drops of the night.
: I did mourn as a dove: mine eyes fail with looking upward: O LORD, I am oppressed; undertake for me.
: O ye that dwell in Moab, leave the cities, and dwell in the rock, and be like the dove that maketh her nest in the sides of the hole's mouth.
: Ephraim also is like a silly dove without heart

In Mormonism

The sign of the dove is recorded in the Book of Mormon:

 : abide upon him in the form of a dove. : Holy Ghost descended upon him in the form of a dove.  Book of Abraham, Facsimile 2, Fig. 7 is a sign of the Holy Ghost in the form of a dove.

Joseph Smith taught, "[t]he sign of the dove was instituted before the creation of the world, a witness for the Holy Ghost, and the devil cannot come in the sign of a dove. The Holy Ghost is a personage, and is in the form of a personage. It does not confine itself to the form of the dove, but in sign of the dove. The Holy Ghost cannot be transformed into a dove; but the sign of a dove was given to John who had baptized Jesus to signify the truth of the deed, as the dove is an emblem or token of truth and innocence."

See also
Christian symbolism: Dove

References

Symbols of Abrahamic religions